Montgomery Catholic Preparatory School (MCPS) is a K-12 Catholic school in Montgomery, Alabama on three campuses. It is governed by the Archdiocese of Mobile. Founded in 1873, it is the oldest private K-12 school in Alabama.

History
Founded as St. Mary's of Loretto in 1873 as an all-girls school by the Sisters of Loretto, it became co-ed in 1929 and a diocesan school in 1952, when it was renamed Montgomery Catholic High. As part of a regionalization plan approved by Archbishop Oscar H. Lipscomb in 2001, it merged with St. Bede Catholic Elementary School (K-8) and Our Lady Queen of Mercy Elementary School (K-8) to become Montgomery Catholic Preparatory School. In 2004 it opened a middle school for grades 7-8, and in 2012, it opened Holy Spirit Elementary School.

Academics
MCPS is a college preparatory school, offering both an honors and regular program to its students. In the high school honors program, students may take upper level electives, such as Advanced Placement courses in American History,  Calculus,  English, Biology, Physics, Computer Science, and Fine Arts, as well as honors courses in Chemistry, British Literature, Algebra II, Trigonometry, Latin II and Spanish III, among others.  Between thirty and forty percent of its graduates receive scholarship offers to colleges around the United States. Four years of religion, social studies, science, mathematics and English are required for all students. Electives include offerings in band, physical education, art, computer applications, HTML design, Latin, and Spanish, among others.

Extracurricular
MCPS fields varsity teams in football, volleyball, cheerleading, cross-country, basketball, softball, soccer, girls' tennis, track, baseball and wrestling. Introductory Band begins in 5th grade, Intermediate Band in grades 7-8, with a concert and marching band for grades 7-12. Students may also participate in yearbook, key club, pep club, student government and right to life clubs at the high school level.

Facilities
MCPS has three campuses, all located in east Montgomery: the St. Bede campus (K4-6) on the corner of Atlanta Highway and Perry Hill Road, the Holy Spirit campus (K4-6) at 8580 Vaughn Road and the middle school/high school campus (7-8 and 9-12) at 5350 Vaughn Road.

At the St. Bede campus, there are two academic buildings, a Family Life Center consisting of an infant to PreK day care, meeting rooms and a gym, a fine arts building, a soccer field, playground and a church. The Holy Spirit campus (dedicated August 12, 2012) features a two-story building with 16 classrooms on two levels. In addition to a college preparatory academic program, students at both elementary campuses have access to a robust set of offerings in art, library, resource, computers, and music.

The Middle School/High School campus consists of a high school academic building, a cafeteria/multi-purpose facility, a Science/Library building, a gym, a middle school academic building with band room, a football/soccer stadium, baseball field, softball field, practice fields, concessions, lockers and weight-room.  In 2017 ground was broken on a new gym to accommodate the growth of the athletic program and renovate the existing gym to provide much needed performing art classrooms (including a new band room) and construct a performance auditorium.

Notable alumni

 Ousmane Cisse (born 1982), Malian professional basketball player

Notes and references

External links
Official website

Catholic secondary schools in Alabama
High schools in Montgomery, Alabama
Educational institutions established in 1873
Private middle schools in Alabama
Private elementary schools in Alabama
1873 establishments in Alabama